The Office 2.0 Conference is an annual conference coordinated by Ismael Ghalimi on the subject of Office 2.0, "focused heavily on using collaborative Web technologies to increase productivity gains and business agility". The first conference was in 2006 and the next is scheduled for 2009.

 applies to the term  this context and is owned by Ghalimi's Monolab, Inc.

See also
 Cloud computing
 Online office suite
 Software as a service

References

External links
 2006 site
 Official site

Online office suites